Raidul is a small village, a hill station, a popular holiday destination in Pauri Garhwal district in the Indian state of Uttarakhand.

Geography
It has an average elevation of 1,372 metres (4,462 feet).

Climate
The region has a sub-temperate to temperate climate, which remains pleasant throughout the year. The climate of Raidul is very cold in winter and pleasant in summer. In rainy season the climate is very cool & full of greenness.

Demographics
At the 2001 India census, Raidul had a population of 607, though many people are required to leave by nightfall. Only tourists and those working in the tourism industry may stay overnight. Males constitute 99% of the population and females 1%. Raidul has an average literacy rate of 83%, higher than the Indian national average of 59.5%: male literacy is 63%, and female literacy is 72%. In Raidul, 9% of the population is under 6 years of age. The language most commonly used in Pauri Garhwal is Garhwali.

External links
 Raidul at wikimapia.

Villages in Pauri Garhwal district